Osborne Mine Airport  is located adjacent to the Osborne Mine, Queensland, Australia.

See also
 List of airports in Queensland

References

Airports in Queensland